The Peña Hueva is a tabular mountain at the limits of the Alcarria high plain in the Spanish province of Guadalajara.

It can be reached by dirt tracks from the west.

References 

Mountains of Spain